Jelena Sturanović (born 7 March 1996) is a Montenegrin footballer who plays as a forward. She has been a member of the Montenegro women's national team.

References

1996 births
Living people
Women's association football forwards
Montenegrin women's footballers
Montenegro women's international footballers
Medyk Konin players
Montenegrin expatriate footballers
Montenegrin expatriate sportspeople in Poland
Expatriate women's footballers in Poland
ŽFK Ekonomist players